William Jasper Lewis (1871 – after 1902) was an English professional footballer who played in the Football League for Small Heath and Leicester Fosse.

Lewis was born in the Bordesley Green district of Birmingham. He joined Small Heath from local football in February 1894. He scored on his debut in the First Division on 29 December 1894, deputising for regular outside right Jack Hallam in a home game against Liverpool which Small Heath won 3–0. Though he kept his place for the next game, his only other appearance for the first team was in the 1896 FA Cup first round match against Bury, in which he also scored. Despite a goal return of two in three games, he returned to non-league football later that year. Some six years later he resumed his Football League career with Leicester Fosse; he scored three goals in 30 Second Division games before returning to former club Stourbridge.

Notes

References

1871 births
Year of death missing
Footballers from Birmingham, West Midlands
English footballers
Association football wingers
Birmingham City F.C. players
Leicester City F.C. players
Stourbridge F.C. players
English Football League players
Date of birth missing
Place of death missing